Nathan Michael Sudfeld (born October 7, 1993) is an American football quarterback who is a free agent. He played college football at Indiana and was drafted by the Washington Redskins in the sixth round in the 2016 NFL Draft. Sudfeld also spent four seasons with the Philadelphia Eagles as a backup quarterback, seeing occasional playing time and was a part of their Super Bowl LII-winning team.

High school career
Sudfeld took over as the starting quarterback at Modesto Christian School in Modesto, California, as a junior in 2010, replacing the Fresno State-bound Isaiah Burse. During his time there, he threw for 3,300 yards, 33 touchdowns, and 16 interceptions, earning the Trans Valley League Outstanding Offensive Player award, second-team all-state and first-team all-district honors as a senior.

Recruiting

Sudfeld received offers from UCLA, Indiana, New Mexico State and Arizona. He initially committed to Arizona, but after a coaching and system change, Sudfeld signed with Indiana.

College career
Sudfeld got experience with the Hoosiers as a true freshman, in relief duty of Cameron Coffman, after starter Tre Roberson suffered a broken leg. He earned Big Ten co-Freshman of the Week honours after leading a fourth-quarter comeback against Ball State. In his sophomore year, he split time with Tre Roberson, earning his first start against Bowling Green. He finished the season with 2,523 yards, 21 touchdowns, 9 interceptions and a 142.0 pass efficiency rating.

In Sudfeld's junior year, after both Cameron Coffman and Tre Roberson transferred to Wyoming and Illinois State respectively, he completed 60.5 percent of his passes for 1,151 yards with 6 touchdowns and 3 interceptions as the undisputed starter, before injuring his left shoulder against Iowa, which required surgery, forcing him to miss the rest of the 2014 season. Despite this, he was an Academic All-Big Ten selection and was named to the Manning Award watchlist.

Ahead of the 2015 season, his senior year, Sudfeld attended the Manning Passing Academy at Nicholls State University. He passed for 3,573 yards with 27 touchdowns during his senior season.

Statistics

Professional career

Washington Redskins

Sudfeld was drafted by the Washington Redskins in the sixth round as the 187th overall pick in the 2016 NFL Draft. On May 9, 2016, he signed a four-year, $2.5 million contract with the Redskins. Sudfeld did not see any playing time his rookie year, as he was inactive for all 16 games as the team's third-string quarterback behind starter Kirk Cousins and primary backup Colt McCoy. On September 2, 2017, Sudfeld was waived by the Redskins.

Philadelphia Eagles
On September 3, 2017, Sudfeld was signed to the Philadelphia Eagles' practice squad. He was promoted to the active roster on November 1, 2017. With the NFC's number one seed already clinched, Sudfeld made his first appearance in an NFL regular season game. He saw significant playing time during the season finale, completing 19 of 23 passes for 134 yards as the Eagles lost to the Dallas Cowboys by a score of 6–0. His 83% completion percentage set a new NFL record for completion percentage for a quarterback making his NFL debut (minimum 20 attempts). The record was previously held by Sam Wyche, who completed 80 percent of his passes for the Cincinnati Bengals against the Houston Oilers in 1968. In the NFC Championship against the Minnesota Vikings, he appeared in his first playoff game late in the 4th to take a knee down since the Eagles already locked up the 38–7 victory. The Eagles advanced to Super Bowl LII, where they won a close game against the New England Patriots 41–33, giving the Eagles their first Super Bowl win. Sudfeld was active as the backup to Foles, but did not play a down during the game. On December 30, 2018, Sudfeld came into the game against his former team to replace an injured Nick Foles and threw his first career touchdown pass to Nelson Agholor.

On March 11, 2019, the Eagles placed a second-round restricted free agent tender on Sudfeld. On August 8, 2019, Sudfeld suffered a broken left wrist in the preseason game against the Tennessee Titans. Without Sudfeld, the Eagles lost 27-10. He had surgery the following day with Eagles coach Doug Pederson saying it was likely not a season-ending injury.

The Eagles re-signed Sudfeld to a one-year contract on March 24, 2020. During the last game of the 2020 regular season against the Washington Football Team, Pederson replaced starting quarterback Jalen Hurts with Sudfeld early in the fourth quarter. Sudfeld threw an interception and fumbled on the next two Eagles drives, allowing Washington to win the game 20–14. With the Eagles down by three points before Sudfeld entered the game, the move drew allegations of Pederson deliberately losing the game to increase the team's draft position, although Pederson said the decision was to give Sudfeld the opportunity to play.

San Francisco 49ers
Sudfeld signed a one-year contract with the San Francisco 49ers on April 7, 2021. He was released on August 31, 2021, and re-signed to the practice squad the next day. After rookie quarterback Trey Lance suffered a sprained knee, Sudfeld was elevated to the active roster as the second option behind incumbent starter Jimmy Garoppolo in a Week 7 matchup against the Indianapolis Colts.

On March 10, 2022, Sudfeld re-signed with the 49ers. He was released on August 30, 2022.

Detroit Lions
On August 31, 2022, Sudfeld was signed by the Detroit Lions to be the backup for Jared Goff.

NFL career statistics

Regular season

Personal life
Sudfeld is the son of Ralph and Michelle Sudfeld and has two brothers, twins Matthew and Zach, and two sisters, Juliana and Sarah. Matthew was a wide receiver at Brown, while Zach played at Nevada and played in the NFL as a tight end for the New England Patriots and the New York Jets. Juliana played volleyball for Wheaton College in Illinois. Sarah plays basketball for The King's College in New York City.

References

External links

San Francisco 49ers bio
Indiana Hoosiers bio

1993 births
Living people
American football quarterbacks
Sportspeople from Modesto, California
Players of American football from California
Indiana Hoosiers football players
Washington Redskins players
Philadelphia Eagles players
San Francisco 49ers players
Detroit Lions players
Modesto Christian School alumni